Chi Po-lin (27 December 1964 – 10 June 2017) was a Taiwanese documentary filmmaker, photographer and environmentalist, best known for his 2013 film Beyond Beauty: Taiwan from Above, which won Best Documentary at the 2013 Golden Horse Awards.

On 10 June 2017, Chi along with his assistant Chen Kuan-chi and pilot Chang Chi-kuang died in a helicopter crash in a mountainous area in Hualien County's Fengbin Township. The group was shooting footage for the sequel to Beyond Beauty: Taiwan from Above, which was scheduled for release in 2019. A memorial service was held in Taipei on 14 July 2017. Asteroid 281068 Chipolin, discovered by Taiwanese astronomers Hung-Chin Lin and Ye Quan-Zhi in 2006, was named in his memory. The official  was published by the Minor Planet Center on 4 November 2017. In March 2018, Chunghwa Post announced that still images from the sequel to Beyond Beauty would be released as stamp designs. In April 2019, the Chi Po-lin Space dedicated to Chi opened in Tamsui.

Chi was married and had a son and a daughter.

Filmography

Published works

Awards and nominations

See also
Taiwanese art

References

External links 

 
 

1964 births
2017 deaths
21st-century photographers
Taiwanese documentary film directors
Taiwanese photographers
Taiwanese cinematographers
Taiwanese environmentalists
Film directors from Taipei
Victims of helicopter accidents or incidents
Victims of aviation accidents or incidents in Taiwan
Aerial photographers